Alan Gowans (November 30, 1923 – August 19, 2001) was an influential art historian and university academic, educated at the University of Toronto and Princeton University.  A charismatic teacher and prolific author, his academic specialty was North American architecture, frequently highlighting such unheralded structures as gas stations, restaurants, motels, bungalows and mail-order homes, and exploring their social, cultural and national significance. His trilogy of books, The Unchanging Arts, The Restless Art, and Learning to See are indispensable works for aspiring artists and art historians, categorizing the arts into social functions to offer readers the most lucid history of art based on historical evidence. These works and his courses were incredibly influential, yet controversial for their time. Gowan's body of work was eventually drowned out by modernist and post-modern perspectives. Perhaps his most influential work was Images of American Living.

A partial list of the teaching and research institutions at which Gowans held teaching positions includes: Rutgers University, Middlebury College, Harvard University, University of Edinburgh, Stockholm University and Uppsala University. A former president of the Society of Architectural Historians, he served as chairman of the art history department at the University of Delaware and as founding chairman of the Department of History in Art at the University of Victoria in Victoria, British Columbia. From Victoria, he spearheaded an international and cross-cultural approach to the history of art, bringing notable scholars such as Siri Gunasinghe to the new university, and guest lecturers as varied as Immanuel Velikovsky, Boris Piotrovsky and Hans Wolfgang Müller.

In 1988 he settled in Washington DC, archiving an extensive personal collection of architectural photographs, a unique resource now held in the CASVA archives containing over 10,000 images of vernacular architecture.  Gowans acted as a consultant for the Ken Burns/Lynn Novick Film Frank Lloyd Wright (1998). He continued to live a scholar's life until his death in 2001.

References

1923 births
2001 deaths
Canadian art historians
Canadian male non-fiction writers
Canadian expatriates in the United States
University of Toronto alumni
Princeton University alumni
Canadian expatriates in England
Canadian expatriates in Sweden